is a city in Saitama Prefecture, Japan. , the city had an estimated population of 66,022 and a population density of 3300 persons per km2.

Geography
In east-central Saitama Prefecture, Kitamoto is on the central reaches of the Arakawa River, and is within commuting distance of downtown Tokyo.

Surrounding municipalities
Saitama Prefecture
 Okegawa
 Kōnosu
 Kawajima
 Yoshimi

Climate
Kitamoto has a humid subtropical climate (Köppen Cfa) characterized by warm summers and cool winters with light to no snowfall.  The average annual temperature in Kitamoto is 14.6 °C. The average annual rainfall is 1353 mm with September as the wettest month. The temperatures are highest on average in August, at around 26.6 °C, and lowest in January, at around 3.6 °C.

Demographics
Per Japanese census data, the population of Kitamoto has recently plateaued after a long period of growth.

History
Kōnosu-shuku was one of the post stations on the Nakasendō highway until 1602, when it was relocated north; the original location was renamed Motojuku, and later, Kitamotojuku, which is the origin of the name of the modern city. With the establishment of the modern municipalities system on April 1, 1889, Kitamotojuku was merged with several neighboring hamlets to form the village of Ishito within Kitaadachi District, Saitama. On February 11, 1943, Ishito was merged with neighboring Nakamaru to form Kitamotojuku Village. On November 3, 1959, the village was elevated to town status, becoming Kitamoto Town. Kitamoto attained city status on November 3, 1971.

Government
Kitamoto has a mayor-council form of government with a directly elected mayor and a unicameral city council of 20 members. Kitamoto contributes one member to the Saitama Prefectural Assembly. In terms of national politics, the city is part of Saitama 6th district of the lower house of the Diet of Japan.

Economy
Due to this location, Kitamoto is primarily a bedroom community with a high percentage of its population commuting to either Saitama City or the Tokyo metropolis for work.

Education
Kitamoto has eight public elementary schools and four public middle schools operated by the city government, and one public high school operated by the Saitama Prefectural Board of Education.

Transportation

Railway
 JR East – Takasaki Line

Highway

Noted people from Kitamoto
Atsushi Oshima, politician

References

External links

Official Website 

Cities in Saitama Prefecture
Kitamoto, Saitama